The Palembang metropolitan area, known locally as Patungraya Agung (an acronym of Palembang–Betung–Indaralaya–Kayu Agung), is a metropolitan area in South Sumatra, Indonesia. It encompasses Palembang as the core city and parts of the three surrounding regencies: Banyuasin Regency, Ogan Ilir Regency, and Ogan Komering Ilir Regency. It is the second-largest metropolitan area in Sumatra with an estimated population of 2.5 million.

Definition

The official delineation of Patungraya Agung encompasses all 16 districts of the City of Palembang, plus 11 districts of Banyuasin Regency, 7 districts of Ogan Ilir Regency and 4 districts of Ogan Komering Ilir Regency. It covers an area of 7,585.96 km2 with a population of 2,570,981.

References

Metropolitan areas of Indonesia
South Sumatra